"Seein' Red" is a song by the San Diego-based rock band Unwritten Law, released as the second single from the band's 2002 album, Elva. It was written by singer Scott Russo and produced by Michael "Miguel" Happoldt. It became the highest-charting single of the band's career, holding the number one spot on Billboard's Modern Rock Tracks chart for four weeks between May and June 2002.

Track listing

Personnel

Band
Scott Russo – vocals
Steve Morris – lead guitar
Rob Brewer - rhythm guitar
Pat "PK" Kim – bass guitar
Wade Youman – drums

Additional musicians
Miguel – upbeat guitar on "Seein' Red"

Production
Miguel – producer
Mark DeSisto and Tobias Miller – engineers
Dan Chase, Tal Herzberg, and Baraka – Pro Tools
Eddie Ashworth – additional engineering
Mike McMullen and Jerry Moss – assistant engineers
David J. Holman – mixing
Brian Garder – mastering

Artwork
Dean Karr – photography

Charts

References

2002 singles
Unwritten Law songs
2002 songs
Interscope Records singles
Music videos directed by Marc Webb